New York State Route 64 (NY 64) is a north–south state highway in the Finger Lakes region of New York in the United States. Its southern terminus is at an intersection with NY 21 in the hamlet of Bristol Springs within the town of South Bristol, Ontario County. The northern terminus is at a junction with NY 96 and NY 252 in the village of Pittsford, Monroe County. NY 64 is a mostly two-lane highway that primarily serves as a connector between the southeastern suburbs of the city of Rochester and the Canandaigua Lake area, home to Bristol Mountain Ski Resort. Near the midpoint of the route, NY 64 has an overlap with U.S. Route 20 (US 20) and NY 5 that takes the route through the village of Bloomfield.

The majority of what is now NY 64 was originally designated as part of Route 14, an unsigned legislative route, by the New York State Legislature in 1908. In the vicinity of Bloomfield, however, Route 14 initially followed what later became NY 20C in order to access Holcomb. The alignment of Route 14 through Bloomfield was modified in 1921 to use modern NY 64 instead. When the first set of posted routes in New York were assigned in 1924, the portion of Route 14 between Mendon and Pittsford became part of NY 15. In the 1930 renumbering of state highways in New York, NY 15 was realigned to follow a new routing to the east while the Mendon–Pittsford segment of its former routing became the basis for NY 64, a new route that extended southward over the post-1921 routing of legislative Route 14 to South Bristol.

Route description

NY 64 begins at an intersection with NY 21 on a ridge overlooking Canandaigua Lake in Bristol Springs, a hamlet of South Bristol. The route heads to the northwest as a two-lane highway, running in the base of the Bristol Valley, a lowland created by a pair of imposing mountain ranges to the east and west that is home to the Bristol Mountain Ski Resort. The elevation of NY 64 remains virtually unchanged, however, as it progresses northward.  from Bristol Center, the route meets US 20A.

At this point, NY 64 turns west onto US 20 and NY 5. The three routes head westward across mostly open fields, meeting the southern terminus of NY 444 south of the former village of Holcomb. Past the junction, which once served as the eastern terminus of NY 20C, US 20, NY 5, and NY 64 continue into the village of Bloomfield before NY 64 breaks from NY 5 and US 20 and turns northward toward Rochester once again.

North of West Main Street, the highway curves to the northwest as it exits East Bloomfield and enters the adjacent town of West Bloomfield. In the northeast corner of the town, NY 64 passes through the hamlet of Ionia. Northwest of the community, the route breaks to the north, taking a due north alignment as it passes into Monroe County and becomes Mendon–Ionia Road. The road stays on a relatively straight path northward as it heads through the rural southern portion of the town of Mendon to the hamlet of Mendon, where NY 64 meets NY 251 in the center of the community.

On the opposite side of NY 251, NY 64 becomes Pittsford–Mendon Road. Outside of the hamlet, the highway maintains a consistent northerly alignment as it runs through slightly more populated areas of the town of Mendon and passes over the New York State Thruway (Interstate 90 or I-90). The route enters the town of Pittsford a short distance north of the Thruway, at which time NY 64 becomes Mendon Road. Within Pittsford, NY 64 passes through increasingly more populated areas as it approaches the village of Pittsford. Directly south of the village, the highway enters an intersection with South Main Street, Stone Road and Mendon Center Road at a sharp angle. NY 253 once entered this junction on Mendon Center Road and followed NY 64 into Pittsford; however, today, NY 64 continues alone onto South Main Street. The route ends just under  later at the junction of South Main Street and Jefferson Road, where it meets NY 96 and NY 252.

History

In 1908, the New York State Legislature created Route 14, an unsigned legislative route that extended from Corning to Rochester via South Bristol and Pittsford. The majority of Route 14 south of Pittsford was routed on what is now NY 64; however, in the vicinity of Bloomfield, Route 14 broke from modern NY 64 and used what later became NY 20C to access Holcomb. At the same time, the portion of current NY 64 that overlaps with US 20 and NY 5 was included in Route 6, a cross-state highway connecting Albany to Buffalo. On March 1, 1921, Route 14 was altered to bypass Holcomb to the south on what is now NY 64.

When the first set of posted routes in New York were assigned in 1924, the portion of legislative Route 14 between Mendon and Pittsford became part of NY 15, a route that mostly followed the current alignment of NY 96 from Owego to Rochester. Between Victor and Pittsford, however, NY 15 strayed from the modern routing of NY 96 and followed what is now NY 251 to Mendon. At the same time, the segment of legislative Route 6 in East Bloomfield became part of both NY 5 and NY 5A. The NY 5A designation was replaced along this stretch with NY 7 by 1926, which in turn was replaced by US 20 in 1927. In the 1930 renumbering of state highways in New York, NY 15 was realigned to bypass Mendon to the northeast by way of the current alignment of NY 96 between Victor and Pittsford. The former alignment of NY 15 from Pittsford to Mendon became part of NY 64, a new route that extended south to South Bristol over the post-1921 routing of legislative Route 14. The  portion of NY 64 between Vincent and South Bloomfield became part of US 20A , allowing the route to reconnect to US 20 at South Bloomfield.

NY 64 briefly extended north of the village of Pittsford during the 1950s and 1960s. In the mid-1950s, NY 96 was realigned onto the new Eastern Expressway from Bushnell's Basin to NY 31F near East Rochester. From there, NY 96 followed modern NY 31F west to East Avenue, where it rejoined its original alignment. The portion of NY 96's original surface routing between the village of Pittsford and what is now NY 31F became part of an extended NY 64. A northwest extension of the freeway to what is now the Can of Worms was completed  as a realignment of NY 96, resulting in another extension of NY 64 along East Avenue to the eastern edge of Rochester. NY 64 and NY 96 were restored to their pre-1950s alignments  when the Eastern Expressway was designated as I-490.

Major intersections

See also

References

External links

064
Transportation in Monroe County, New York
Transportation in Ontario County, New York